Glenda Joy Robertson (married name Radley, born 7 March 1961) is an Australian former backstroke swimmer. She competed in two events at the 1976 Summer Olympics.

References

External links
 
 
 
 
 
 

1961 births
Living people
Australian female backstroke swimmers
Olympic swimmers of Australia
Swimmers at the 1976 Summer Olympics
Swimmers at the 1978 Commonwealth Games
Commonwealth Games medallists in swimming
Commonwealth Games bronze medallists for Australia
Place of birth missing (living people)
Medallists at the 1978 Commonwealth Games